Cevizlik is a village in the Artuklu District of Mardin Province in Turkey. The village had a population of 952 in 2021.

References 

Villages in Artuklu District
Kurdish settlements in Mardin Province